Little Hurricane is an American dirty blues band based in San Diego, California. Formed in 2010, the band consists of front man Anthony "Tone" Catalano and drummer Celeste "C.C." Spina.

History 
In 2010, Chicago-born Spina (a cook and bartender) resumed playing drums after eight years away from a set and put an advertisement on Craigslist looking for like-minded musicians. Guitarist Anthony “Tone” Catalano (former studio engineer) caught her attention when he mentioned his jazz-band days in high school. “I’ve been writing songs for years, looking for drummers,” says Tone (who relocated from Santa Cruz to San Diego). “I think it’s unique to have a girl drummer.” says Tone, who makes custom guitar slides from wine- and whiskey-bottle necks.

The band has toured in direct support for multiple North American tours for the English ska band The Specials, as well as supported Manchester Orchestra, White Denim, The John Butler Trio, and the Heartless Bastards.

In 2016, the band licensed their fourth studio album, Same Sun Same Moon, to Mascot Records. It was released on April 14, 2017, and became their second album to appear on the Billboard Heatseekers Albums Chart.

Music
One of their songs “Get By” was featured on the television show Revenge season one episode five which aired on ABC. The song is playing in the background during a bar scene.

As "Tone“ mentioned in a video livestream, the song "Crocodile Tears“ was originally written for the soundtrack for the movie "Two Hundred Thousand Dirty."

Their song, “Bad Business” is also featured on the soundtrack for the video game "MLB The Show 16".
 
Their song "Sweet Pea" was featured on ABC's "Mistresses". Their song "Haunted Heart" was featured on "Gossip Girl", and their music was featured on ESPN's "Firstwatch". The band was named as an "Artist to Watch" by Sports Illustrated in 2012 and their song "Give em Hell" was featured in a video for the magazine's Swimsuit Edition. 

Their music has also been licensed to the movies "The Motel Life", "Two Hundred Thousand Dirty" and Brooklyn Brothers Beat The Best.

The band has been featured on KROQ.

To date, the band has been featured in five Taco Bell TV advertisements. The songs "Haunted Heart", "Hold Me Back", "Trouble Ahead", "Isn't It Great" and a cover of Starland Vocal Band's "Afternoon Delight" were featured in a series of Taco Bell commercials.

The band has received several awards from the San Diego Music Awards, including Album of the Year ("Same Sun Same Moon", 2016), Song of the Year ("Heart Skips a Beat", 2015) Artist of the Year (2014) Album of the Year ("Gold Fever", 2014) Best Live Act (2013) Album of the Year ("Homewrecker", 2012) and Best New Artist (2010).

Performances
Little Hurricane has performed in major festivals, including Austin City Limits Music Festival, Bottlerock Napa 2017, Telluride Blues and Brews, Parkenfestivalen, Summerfest, Lollapalooza and South by Southwest. Their performances have been featured in leading publications such as Rolling Stone.

As of 2015, they have headlined tours and festivals in at least 11 countries including Australia, Norway, Sweden, France, Switzerland, Spain, Germany and England.

Members
Anthony “Tone” Catalano – guitar, vocals (2010–present) 
 Celeste “CC” Spina – drums, vocals (2010–present)

Discography

Homewrecker (2011)

Track listing

Stay Classy (A Collection of Cover Songs) (2013)

Track listing

Gold Fever (2014)

Track listing

Same Sun Same Moon (2017)

Track listing

Love Luck (2019)

Track listing

References

External links

Boikdaddy (2011) Biography from Reverbnation. Retrieved March 24, 2012
AbcGo (2011) Official Revenge website. Retrieved March 24, 2012

Rock music groups from California